Prasarn Pansamlee is a Thai retired footballer. He played for Samut Songkhram F.C. in the Thai Premier League. In 2012, playing for Rayong United F.C., he received a lifetime ban from the Football Association of Thailand for attempted assault against the referee during a match. The ban was later reduced to two years.

References

1982 births
Living people
Prasarn Pansamlee
Association football midfielders
Prasarn Pansamlee